East African Breweries Limited, commonly referred to as EABL, is a Kenyan-based holding company that manufactures branded beer, spirits, and non-alcoholic beverages.

Overview 
The group's headquarters are located in Nairobi, Kenya, with subsidiaries in Kenya, Uganda, Tanzania and South Sudan. The group has distribution partners in Burundi, Democratic Republic of Congo and Rwanda.

History

1920–1949 
East African Breweries Limited was founded in 1922, as Kenya Breweries Limited (KBL), by two white settlers, George and Charles Hurst. The company was owned by the Dodd family of Kenya.

KBL acquired Tanganyika-based Tanganyika Breweries in 1935 and 1936 these two companies were merged leading to the creation of the East African Breweries Limited (EABL). The group continued expanding locally through the opening of more breweries such as Mombasa brewery.

1950–1999 
In 1954, EABL got listed on the Nairobi Securities Exchange. This was among the first listings in the region's oldest stock exchange. As a group, EABL expanded to Uganda through the acquisition of Uganda Breweries in 1959.

In 1964, the group's subsidiary name in present-day Tanzania was changed from Tanganyika Breweries Limited to Tanzania Breweries Limited (TBL) following the political unification of Tanganyika and the People's Republic of Zanzibar and Pemba to form the United Republic of Tanzania. This led to increased market for the group through the creation of union. However, in 1979 the Government of Tanzania nationalized TBL as part of the Arusha Declaration. The group officially opened 1987 Central Glass Industries Limited (CGI), as a producer of glass containers and bottles therefor leading to internal sourcing.

By 1990, the Dodd family had reduced their shareholding and most of the shareholders were Kenyan and the company was very successful.

2000–2010 
In 2000, Diageo acquired majority control of EABL and in the following year the group cross-listed its share on the Uganda Securities Exchange. EABL is a constituent company of the NSE 20 Share Index.

The beer wars 
In the late 1990s to the early 2000s was a period of beer wars in East Africa involving South African Breweries International (Now SABMiller) and EABL.

These wars ended in 2002 when EABL signed license agreements with South African Breweries International and agreed to terms for share swap in their subsidiaries: Kenya Breweries Limited and Tanzania Breweries Limited (now an SABI subsidiary).

In share exchange EABL acquired a 20% equity stake in TBL and agreed to issue SABI a similar share Kenya Breweries Limited.

And SABI exited the Kenyan market while EABL exited the Tanzanian market by handing over its Kibo subsidiary to TBL.
This partnership gave TBL 98% share of the Tanzanian market as of 2004.

In the same year, EABL acquired 100% of shares in International Distillers Uganda Limited and 46.32% of the issued shares of UDV Kenya Limited.

The partnership between EABL and SAB Miller in Tanzania went through turbulence in 2009, with EABL claiming breach of contract by Tanzania Breweries (TBL), a subsidiary of SAB Miller, accusing it of manufacture of low quality EABL products under a previously agreed arrangement and at the same time restricting access to the Tanzanian market of some of Diageo/EABL products.

This led to EABL's acquisition of 51% of Serengeti Breweries Limited (SBL) and exit from TBL's shareholder structure through a $71.5 million successful secondary offer on the Dar es Salaam Stock Exchange in 2011. SAB Miller sold it stake Kenya Breweries to East African Breweries.

2010 – To date 
In 2013, EABL commenced operations in South Sudan through the establishment of East African Beverages South Sudan Limited (EABSS) as a depot in Juba in order to reduce over reliance on third party distributors' logistical arrangements that led to periodic stock outs.

Subsidiaries 
The subsidiaries of EABL include:

Current group companies 
 Kenya Breweries Limited (KBL) – Nairobi, Kenya- 100% Shareholding -Established in Kenya in 1922. The company's core business is brewing of Beer and bottling of non-alcoholic malt beverages.
 Uganda Breweries Limited (UBL) – Port Bell, Uganda – 98.2% Shareholding – UBL has been a brewer in Uganda since 1946.
 United Distillers Vintners (Kenya) Limited (UDV) – Nairobi, Kenya – 46.32% Shareholding – UDV was established in 1962. UDV Kenya Limited is majority owned by Diageo PLC, which holds 53.68% shares. EABL manages the company on behalf of Diageo. Its core business is the manufacture, marketing and sales of spirit based alcoholic beverages. It also imports and distributes premium spirit brands from the parent company.
 International Distillers Uganda Limited (IDU) – Port Bell, Uganda – 100% Shareholding – Acquired in June 2012 from Selviac Nederland, is a subsidiary of Guinness UDV. The company manufactures, markets and sales of spirits in Uganda.
 East African Maltings (Kenya) Limited – Nairobi, Kenya – 100% Shareholding – EAML-Kenya plays a vital role of supplying quality brewing raw materials in the form of Malt, Barley and Sorghum to the brewing units of the EABL group in Kenya.
 East African Maltings (Uganda) Limited – Kampala, Uganda – 100% Shareholding – EAML-Uganda plays a vital role of supplying quality brewing raw materials in the form of Malt, Barley and Sorghum to the brewing units of the EABL group in Uganda.
 EABL International Limited – Nairobi, Kenya – 100% Shareholding – EABLi (formerly EABL Venture) was set up in 2009, the venture's business was to focus on building the Spirits business in Eastern Africa and driving the geographic expansion through greater focus to drive a total beverage business and through expansion into new markets such as The Great Lakes Region.  EABLi operates in Southern Sudan, Rwanda, Burundi and DRC through third party supply, exports, and covering the spirits portfolio for both domestic and duty-free sales as well as beer sales in the markets where the group does not have local operations.

 Serengeti Breweries Limited (SBL) – Dar Es Salaam, Tanzania – 51% Shareholding – SBL is the second largest beer company in Tanzania, with a market share of approximately 28% of the Tanzanian branded beer sector. The company was incorporated in 1988 as Associated Breweries Limited. Its name was changed to Serengeti Breweries Limited in 2002.  EABL acquired 51% of the issued share capital of SBL in October 2010.
 East African Beverages South Sudan Limited (EABSS) – Juba, South Sudan – 99% Shareholding – EABSS commenced operations in 2013 with the set-up of a depot in Juba from which it would supply beer and spirits to its distributors.

Previous investments 
 Central Glass Industries Limited (CGI) – Nairobi, Kenya – Established in 1987, as a wholly owned subsidiary, to produce glass containers in flint, amber and green to internationally required standards. CGI is the leading container glass manufacturer in Kenya. CGI exports more than 50% of it products to countries such as Uganda, Tanzania, Ethiopia, Rwanda, Burundi, Eritrea, Seychelles, Réunion, Mauritius, Zimbabwe, Zambia and Angola. CGI was acquired by South African-based Consol Glass in May 2015 for US$47 million.

Ownership and listing
The group's largest shareholder is Diageo Plc. EABL is listed on the Nairobi Stock Exchange, Uganda Securities Exchange and Dar es Salaam Stock Exchanges. The shareholding in the group's stock was as depicted in the table below:

Products

Tusker brands

Tusker is the main brand of Kenya Breweries with over 30% of the Kenyan beer market selling more than 700,000 hectolitres per year. Tusker is also the largest African beer brand in the Diageo group. It is a 4.2% ABV pale lager. The brand was first marketed in 1923, shortly after the founder of Kenya Breweries Ltd, George Hurst, was killed by an elephant during a hunting accident. His remaining founder and brother Charles decided to name the company's first ever lager, Tusker, since large, male elephants indigenous to East Africa, were called tuskers. It was in this year that the elephant logo, that is synonymous with Tusker Lager, was incorporated. The slogan "Bia Yangu, Nchi Yangu", means  "My Beer, My Country" in Swahili.

In early 2008, the UK supermarket chain Tesco began selling Tusker, followed soon after by Sainsbury's.

Varieties
 Tusker, sold in keg, widget cans and bottles: 4.2% ABV pale lager
 Tusker Malt: 5.0% ABV premium lager
 Tusker Lite: 4.0% ABV lite lager

Tusker Lager, Tusker Malt Lager, Pilsner and White Cap Lager have received each a Gold Quality Award at the World Quality Selections, organised yearly by Monde Selection, a highly respected International Quality Institute.

Other brands
The company also makes Uganda Waragi, a 40% ABV brand of waragi, a traditional Ugandan liquor, and the leading branded distilled beverage in Uganda. It is triple distilled and made from millet. It is known in Uganda as "the Spirit of Uganda". The main markets include other African countries such as Rwanda, the Democratic Republic of Congo and Sudan.

In 1965, "The Enguli Act" decreed that distillation would only be legal under license, and distillers should sell to the parastatal Uganda Distilleries Limited, which produced a branded bottled product, marketed under the name Uganda Waragi.
 White Cap Lager 4.2%
 White Cap Crisp3%
 Pilsner 4.7% Pale Lager
 Pilsner Ice – 5.2% ABV pale lager
 Guinness Foreign Extra Stout – 7.5% ABV stout
 Allsopps Lager – 5.5% ABV lager
 Senator Lager – 6.0% ABV barley beer
 President Extra Lager – 6.6% ABV lager
 Bell Lager
 Serengeti Lager

EABL Foundation 
The EABL Foundation is the corporate social responsibility arm of East African Breweries, founded in 2005. It assists people in Kenya, Uganda and Tanzania through five areas of activity:  water supply, education and training, health, environment, and special projects. Through the skills for life program, The EABL Foundation provides scholarships for undergraduates in the three East African Countries.

Its ongoing projects include the construction of an optical center in Moshi, Tanzania, the support of the Sickle Cell Association of Uganda and the donation of an Ultra Sound Machine to Kirwara Hospital in Thika, Kenya. The foundation has supplied over KSh.70 million/= (approx. US$972,000) in university scholarships.

The EABL Foundation conducts special projects in times of disaster and when emergency relief is needed. Most recently, the foundation took part in the Save A Life Fund, in which it donated over KSh.14 million/= (approx. US$194,000) towards famine relief.

Association football sponsorships

Kenyan Premier League

On 21 August 2012, the company signed a deal worth KSh.170 million/= (US$2.02 million; £1.28 million stg; €1.62 million) with the Kenyan Premier League for its renaming to the Tusker Premier League. This made it the most lucrative deal ever made in Kenyan football history.

Tusker F.C.

Tusker FC is a football club owned by East African Breweries. It is based in Nairobi, Kenya. It is the third most successful club in Kenya with eight Kenyan league championships and three Kenyan cup wins. In addition, it has won four East African CECAFA Clubs Cup titles.

The club was known as "Kenya Breweries" until 1999, when the current name was adopted. Tusker has two home stadiums, the Moi International Sports Centre, where it mainly plays its home matches, and the Ruaraka Sports Ground.

CECAFA Cup
In August 2012, East African Breweries signed a sponsorship deal worth US$450,000 with CECAFA to have the CECAFA Cup renamed to the CECAFA Tusker Challenge Cup.

See also
 Beer in Africa
 Beer in Kenya
 Beer in Tanzania

References

Bibliography
 Justin Willis, Potent Brews: A Social History of Alcohol in East Africa, 1850–1999, British Institute in Eastern Africa (2002),

External links
 East African Breweries Ltd.
 Profile of East African Breweries at myStocks KE
 Nairobi Stocks Exchange
 EABL Foundation. 

1922 establishments in Kenya
Diageo
Breweries of Africa
Beer in Kenya
Companies listed on the Uganda Securities Exchange
Companies listed on the Dar es Salaam Stock Exchange
Companies listed on the Nairobi Securities Exchange
Manufacturing companies based in Nairobi
Food and drink companies established in 1922